Rick Stratton is an American make-up and special effects artist. He won an Primetime Emmy Award in 1999 for his work on The X-Files and in 1990 for his work on Alien Nation. Stratton has been nominated a total of eight times. His other work includes Pirates of the Caribbean, Star Trek: The Motion Picture, Beetlejuice, Jarhead, War of the Worlds and How the Grinch Stole Christmas.

References

External links

Living people
Year of birth missing (living people)
Place of birth missing (living people)
Special effects people
American make-up artists
Primetime Emmy Award winners